Shirvan (also Romanized as Shīrvān; also known as Sharkat Zarayi Shirvan Chafa (Persian: شركت زراعي شيروان چفا), also Romanized as Sharḵat Zarāʿī Shīrvān Chafā, Shahrak-e Shirvan (Persian: شهرك شيروان), also Romanized as Shahraḵ-e Shīrvān, Ḩasanābād, Raḩīmābād, and Shīrvān Chaqā) is a village in Shirvan Rural District, in the Central District of Borujerd County, Lorestan Province, Iran. At the 2006 census, its population was 1,101, in 280 families.

See also 
 Ban Shirvan
 Bi Bi Shirvan
 Karkhaneh-ye Qand-e Shirvan
 Now Shirvan Kola
 Shirvan
 Shirvan County
 Shirvan District
 Shirvan, Iran
 Shirvan Mahalleh
 Shirvan Rural District
 Shirvan Shahlu

References 

Towns and villages in Borujerd County